Boris Sergeevich Ugarov (6 February 1922 – 2 August 1991) was a Russian Soviet realist painter and art educator, Honored Artist of the RSFSR, who lived and worked in Leningrad. He was a member of the Leningrad Union of Artists regarded as one of the brightest representatives of the Leningrad school of painting.

Biography 
Ugarov was born in Petrograd in 1922. At the onset of the Great Patriotic War, he volunteered in the militia. He then served as an artilleryman, gunner, took part in battles in the Leningrad and Volkhov fronts, in Karelia and on the Far East. He was awarded several bravery and campaign medals.

After demobilization in 1945 he entered the Leningrad Institute of Painting, Sculpture and Architecture named after Ilya Repin, where he studied of Victor Oreshnikov and Andrei Mylnikov. In 1951 Boris Ugarov graduated from the Repin Institute of Arts in Igor Grabar workshop with the rank of artist of painting. His degree work was a painting titled "Spring on the collective farm".

In 1951–1954 Ugarov engaged in postgraduate institute under the leadership of Alexander Gerasimov. In 1952 he began to teach at the Repin Institute. In the same year he became a member of the Leningrad Union of Artists. Starting in 1951, Boris Ugarov participated in Art Exhibitions. He painted genre and historical paintings, portraits and landscapes. In 1975–1979 Ugarov headed the Leningrad Union of Artists. In 1977 he was appointed rector of the Repin Institute of Arts. In 1978 he was elected a member of the USSR Academy of Arts. In 1982 Boris Ugarov was awarded the honorary title of the People's Artist of the USSR. In 1983 he was elected President of the USSR Academy of Arts, occupying this post until 1991.

Ugarov died on 2 August 1991 in Saint Petersburg at the age of seventy. His paintings reside in State Russian Museum, State Tretyakov Gallery, in art museums and private collections in Russia, Japan, Ukraine, France, England, Germany, Italy, in the U.S., and others.

Honours and awards
 People's Artist of the USSR (1982)
 USSR State Prize (1985) – for his film "Renaissance" (1980)
 Repin State Prize of the RSFSR (1976) – for the picture "In the land of freedom", "June 1941", "Earth"
 Order of the Patriotic War, 2nd class (1985)
 Order of the Red Star
 Medal "For the Victory over Germany in the Great Patriotic War 1941–1945"
 Medal "For the Victory over Japan"
 Medal for Combat Service

See also

 Fine Art of Leningrad
 Leningrad School of Painting
 List of Russian artists
 List of 20th-century Russian painters
 List of painters of Saint Petersburg Union of Artists
 Saint Petersburg Union of Artists
 Academicheskaya Dacha

References

Further reading 
 Exhibition of works by Leningrad artists of 1961. Exhibition catalogue. – Leningrad: Khudozhnik RSFSR, 1964. – p. 41.
 The Leningrad Fine Arts Exhibition. – Leningrad: Khudozhnik RSFSR, 1964. – p. 57–58.
 Matthew C. Bown. Dictionary of 20th Century Russian and Soviet Painters 1900-1980s. – London: Izomar 1998. , .
 Irina Romanycheva. Academic Dacha. History and traditions. – Saint Petersburg: Petropol Publishing House, 2009. – p. 2, 6.

1922 births
1991 deaths
20th-century Russian painters
Russian male painters
Soviet painters
Socialist realist artists
Leningrad School artists
Repin Institute of Arts alumni
Members of the Leningrad Union of Artists
Honored Artists of the Russian Federation
People's Artists of Russia (visual arts)
Full Members of the USSR Academy of Arts
Recipients of the USSR State Prize
Soviet military personnel of World War II
20th-century Russian male artists